Mutations, subtitled "From L.P. C.D. M.C.", is an EP by Orbital. Selected artists picked an Orbital track, all from the 1991 Green Album, to remix. Orbital themselves contributed two remixes to this EP.

The EP was released on vinyl in two parts, and as one CD or MC.

Remixers

Artwork

The sleeves for the two 12" vinyls were designed by Gavin Fulton (Fultano 92). Part 1 (FX 181) features an orange Orbital "loopz" logo on a beige background and part 2 (FXR 181) is reversed.

Samples

"Chime Crime" samples "Material Girl" by Madonna.
"Chime (Ray Keith Mutation)" samples "Daydreaming" by Baby D.
"Oolaa (Meat Beat Manifesto Mutation)" samples "Go Now" by Was (Not Was)

References

1991 EPs
Techno EPs
Electronic EPs
Orbital (band) EPs
FFRR Records EPs